Håkan Ingvar von Eichwald (April 2, 1908, Turku – May 1, 1964, Malmö) was a Finnish-Swedish bandleader and conductor. He led dance bands which featured some of Sweden's most prominent early jazz musicians, and later became a conductor of symphonic and operatic works.

Von Eichwald was born into a Russian-Finnish noble family in Finland but lived most of his life in Sweden. He learned to play piano as a toddler and was playing public concerts at age six. By his late teens he was leading theater ensembles in Stockholm, and in 1930 began leading a dance band at the club Kaos. He led this group until 1932 and recorded with it; two years later, Arne Hülphers took over this group. He formed a new ensemble in 1936, which toured western Europe and recorded several times. Von Eichwald's ensembles featured musicians who were pivotal to Swedish jazz, including Charlie Norman, Thore Ehrling, Zilas Görling, and Gösta Theselius.

After the 1940s, von Eichwald devoted himself to more formal music idioms. He led symphony orchestras and conducted light opera productions, and also did work in scoring Swedish films (including Jack of Hearts).

References
"Håkan von Eichwald." The New Grove Dictionary of Jazz. 2nd edition, ed. Barry Kernfeld.

Notes

1908 births
1964 deaths
Swedish jazz bandleaders
Swedish conductors (music)
Male conductors (music)
Finnish emigrants to Sweden
Finnish people of Russian descent
Swedish people of Russian descent
20th-century Swedish male musicians